Tamara Savage is an American songwriter born in 1979 in California, who started writing songs in 1998 at the age of 19. She has written for Tamia, Monica, Faith Evans, Nicole Wray, Mary Mary, Heather Headley, Shanice, Whitney Houston, Mýa and Tracie Spencer.  The first song she wrote was "The First Night" by Monica. She has also co-wrote "Take Me There" for The Rugrats Movie and its soundtrack.

References

Living people
1979 births
Songwriters from California